Roma Rovers Football Club is a Lesotho football club based in the town of Roma in the Maseru District.

The team currently plays in Lesotho Premier League.

In 1996 the team won the Lesotho Premier League.

Stadium
Currently the team plays at the Machabeng Stadium.

Fans
Most of the Football Club's fans are students attending 
the National University of Lesotho.

Honours
Lesotho Premier League: 1996
Lesotho National First Division Champions: 2015

Performance in CAF competitions
1997 CAF Champions League: 1 appearance

References

External links

Football clubs in Lesotho